The Roman Catholic Diocese of Sinop is a diocese located in the city of Sinop in the Ecclesiastical province of Cuiabá in Brazil.

History
 February 6, 1982: Established as Diocese of Sinop from the Diocese of Diamantino

Bishops
 Bishops of Sinop (Roman rite), in reverse chronological order
 Bishop Canisio Klaus (2016.01.20 - Present)
 Bishop Gentil Delázari (1995.03.22 – 2016.01.20)
 Bishop Henrique Froehlich, S.J. (1982.03.25 – 1995.03.22)

Coadjutor bishop
Gentil Delázari (1994-1995)

References
 GCatholic.org
 Catholic Hierarchy

Roman Catholic dioceses in Brazil
Christian organizations established in 1982
Sinop, Roman Catholic Diocese of
Roman Catholic dioceses and prelatures established in the 20th century
1982 establishments in Brazil